Luffenham Heath Golf Course is a  biological Site of Special Scientific Interest east of South Luffenham in Rutland. It is the course of Luffenham Heath Golf Club.

The course is located on several soil types, including calcareous grassland on Jurassic Lower Lincolnshire Limestone, together with acid heath, scrub and broad-leaved woodland. The dominant grasses are tor-grass and upright brome, and the site is notable for its butterflies its diverse insect species.

References

Sites of Special Scientific Interest in Rutland